Jakub Antczak (born 29 April 2004) is a Polish professional footballer who plays as a left winger for Ekstraklasa club Lech Poznań.

Career statistics

Club

Honours
Lech Poznań
 Ekstraklasa: 2021–22

References

External links
 
 

Polish footballers
Sportspeople from Wrocław
2004 births
Living people
Poland youth international footballers
Association football wingers
Lech Poznań II players
Lech Poznań players
Ekstraklasa players
II liga players